William Adams (1813 - 1886) of Ebbw Vale began his career as an apprentice to Charles Lloyd Harford. In 1865 he moved to Cardiff, and commenced business as colliery agent and mining engineer. He was regarded as an expert in his field, his publications include 'Science of Mining' (London, 1870).  He is known to have been one of the first members of Cardiff Naturalists Society.

References 

1813 births
1876 deaths
Welsh engineers
British mining engineers
Welsh scientists
19th-century Welsh scientists
British naturalists
19th-century Welsh businesspeople
19th-century British engineers
British businesspeople in the coal industry
19th-century naturalists
People associated with Amgueddfa Cymru – Museum Wales